Lafayette Elementary School may refer to:

Lafayette Elementary School (Lafayette, Louisiana), NRHP-listed
Lafayette Elementary School (Washington, D.C.), NRHP-listed in western D.C.

Lafayette Elementary School, in Lafayette, California
Lafayette Elementary School, in Lafayette, Tennessee
Lafayette Elementary School, in West Seattle, Washington
Lafayette Elementary School, in the Lincoln Park Public Schools (Michigan) district
Lafayette Elementary School, in the Wayne Public Schools district in New Jersey
Lafayette Elementary School, in the Bound Brook School District in New Jersey
Lafayette Elementary School, in the Greater Albany Public School District in Oregon